Bryan O'Mara is an Irish hurler who plays for Tipperary Senior Championship club Holycross-Ballycahill and at inter-county level with the Tipperary senior hurling team.

Career
O'Mara made his senior debut for Tipperary on 25 January 2020 in the opening round of the 2020 National Hurling League against Limerick in a 0-18 to 2-14 defeat.

O'Mara missed the 2022 season due to travelling during the summer months.

Honours
Tipperary
All-Ireland Under-21 Hurling Championship (1): 2019 
Munster Under-20 Hurling Championship (1): 2019

University of Limerick
Fitzgibbon Cup (1): 2023

References

Living people
Tipperary inter-county hurlers
Year of birth missing (living people)